Monkman is a surname. Notable people with the surname include:

Alexander Monkman (1870–1941), Canadian Métis trading pioneer
Eric Monkman (born c.1987) Canadian academic and television personality 
Francis Monkman (born 1949), English composer
Kent Monkman (born 1965), Canadian artist
Noel Monkman (1896–1969), Australian film director
Percy Monkman (1892-1986), English Landscape artist and entertainer
Phyllis Monkman (1892–1976), English actress

See also
Monkman Provincial Park, a provincial park in British Columbia, Canada
Monkman Pass, a mountain pass in the Canadian Rockies